Essar Salaya Power Plant is a coal-based thermal power plant located near the Essar Refinery at Vadinar, in the Jamnagar district in the Indian state of Gujarat. The power plant is operated by Essar Energy.

The coal for the plant will be sourced from captive mine owned by Essar Energy in Indonesia.

Capacity
It has an installed capacity of 1200 MW (2x600 MW).

References

Coal-fired power stations in Gujarat
Jamnagar district
2012 establishments in Gujarat
Energy infrastructure completed in 2012